Benjamin Elliott Turner (born 28 May 1999) is a British cyclist, who currently ride for UCI WorldTeam .

Career 
In 2021, Turner competed in cyclo-cross and road racing for UCI team .

2022 Ineos Grenadiers 
On 2 November 2021, it was announced Turner had signed for UCI WorldTeam  on a two year contract. His first race with the team was the Vuelta a Andalucía his role was being a Domestique for Carlos Rodríguez who ended up finishing fourth overall. In stage 3, Turner finished fourth after leading out teammate Magnus Sheffield to victory.

His next set of races were the Cobbled classics where one again he was in a domestique role. In the Grand Prix de Denain Turner was part of a five man breakaway with teammates Jhonatan Narváez and Sheffield who attacked with 30km to go but sadly were caught by the peloton with 2km to go, with Turner finishing in 41st position. Gent–Wevelgem was the next race where Turner showed his good form. He managed 28th which was the best placed from his team after spending the day working for Dylan van Baarle who finished in 41st, 17 seconds behind Turner. Turner made the decisive 11-man group with leader Tom Pidcock also there. His work as a domestique chasing down attacks helped Pidcock finish in 3rd position and Turner was able to hold on to finish in 8th, his first top 10 One-day result. Another strong performance by Turner, at the Brabantse Pijl, after working once again as a domestique this time for Sheffield he crossed the line in 4th out sprinting teammate Pidcock and his other 5 breakaway companions.
35km into Paris–Roubaix the bunch was met with cross-winds so Turner went to the front with his Ineos squad and begin to increase the pace, this caused a split with many favourites missing out. By 67km to go the race was mostly together again except for a few riders out in front.  came to the front to drive the pace in doing so caused a split which Turner and teammate van Baarle were a part of. Turner unfortunately crashed on a cobble sector and lost contact with the front bunch. He did manage to keep riding finishing in 11th 4' 30" down on winner Dylan van Baarle.

Major results

Cyclo-cross

2016–2017
 1st Junior Boom
 2nd National Junior Championships
 UCI Junior World Cup
2nd Hoogerheide
 Junior DVV Trophy
2nd Hamme
 Junior Brico Cross
2nd Bredene
 2nd Junior Sint-Niklaas
 3rd  UCI World Junior Championships
2017–2018
 2nd National Under-23 Championships
 3rd Under-23 Overijse
2018–2019
 Under-23 DVV Trophy
1st Niel
1st Loenhout
1st Baal
3rd Koppenberg
3rd Lille
 2nd National Championships
 2nd Overall Under-23 Superprestige
 UCI Under-23 World Cup
3rd Hoogerheide
2019–2020
 3rd National Under-23 Championships
2020–2021
 UCI Under-23 World Cup
2nd Tábor

Road
2021
 2nd Time trial, National Under-23 Championships
 7th Overall Tour d'Eure-et-Loir
2022
 4th Road race, National Championships
 4th Brabantse Pijl
 5th Overall ZLM Toer
 7th Road race, Commonwealth Games
 8th Dwars door Vlaanderen
2023
 1st Vuelta a Murcia
 2nd Clásica Jaén Paraíso Interior

Grand Tour general classification results timeline

References

External links

1999 births
Living people
British male cyclists
Sportspeople from Doncaster
Cyclo-cross cyclists